Wasatch Railroad Contractors was a railroad equipment repair business founded in 1999 by John E. Rimmasch in Heber, Utah. The company specialized in historic railcar and steam locomotive repairs, and employed former Union Pacific Steam manager Steve Lee. The company relocated to Cheyenne, Wyoming in 2005 where it operated a steam locomotive shop and a railcar repair facility Shoshoni, Wyoming.

A string of lawsuits along with a fatal accident at the Shoshoni shop lead to the company declaring bankruptcy in late 2021 and being shut down in early 2022. Wasatch Railroad Contractors and John Rimmasch were eventually charged and convicted of fraud by the US Government due to a mismanaged repair of a coach owned by the Steamtown National Historic Site.

Founding and operation

Wasatch Railroad Contractors was founded by John Rimmasch while he was employed as Chief Mechanical Officer of the Heber Valley Railroad where he oversaw the maintenance of Union Pacific 618 and Great Western 75. Both engines along with visiting Nevada Northern Railway 93 participated in the 2002 Winter Olympics during Rimmasch's tenure in Heber. When Rimmasch left his position at Heber, he relocated his business to Wyoming in 2005. Prior to founding Wasatch, Rimmasch had worked at Lagoon on attractions such as their Wild Kingdom Train Zoo, and during Wasatch's existence they served many live steam operations at various amusement parks.

The company picked up various contracts for restoration jobs over time, including a former Jim Crow era Southern Railway coach which was installed at the National Museum of African American History and Culture. Other prominent jobs included work for the Golden Spike National Historic Site, the Nevada Northern Railway Museum, and the Hawaiian Railway Society. They were also hired by the Abilene and Smoky Valley Railroad to rebuild their locomotive, Santa Fe 3415. Another notable project performed by Wasatch was the restoration of a caboose for display in Black Canyon of the Gunnison National Park. Wasatch's largest static restoration jobs were on former Union Pacific 4004, a Big Boy located in Cheyenne near Wasatch's headquarters and Union Pacific 4023 in Kenefick Park. Wasatch also assisted with work on the Union Pacific Steam Program, aiding in the renovation of auxiliary water tender's used by Union Pacific 844 and Union Pacific 3985 in 2006.

Former Union Pacific Steam Program manager Steve Lee joined Wasatch in 2010 and participated in projects such as relocating a switch engine to a preserved roundhouse in Evanston, Wyoming. and the Louisville & Nashville Railroad 2132 project in Corbin, Kentucky which was championed by Lee as he was a native of the state. During the Corbin project, Wasatch claiming cost overruns attempted to bill an additional $20,000 to the Corbin Tourism Commission, in addition to doing uncontracted work on an attached caboose assuming an eventual contract award for the caboose. Lee also headed a Wasatch supported project to restore Western Pacific Railroad 165 at the Western Pacific Railroad Museum in Portola, California.

Wasatch expanded from their steam and historic repair shop by opening their Shoshoni railcar repair facility in 2015 after purchasing Dimec Rail Services, the previous owner of the shop. In 2021 Wasatch publicly opposed the planned Kansas City Southern Railroad and Canadian Pacific Railroad merger in a filing with the Surface Transportation Board.

Mechanical issues
The Big South Fork Scenic Railway contracted Wasatch to do boiler work on their former Union Railroad 0-6-0 locomotive, the Kentucky & Tennessee 14. Following Wasatch's work on K&T 14 an inspection was performed on the engine by Jason Sobczynski of Next Generation Rail Services who found evidence of shoddy restoration work. The K&T 14 inspection revealed Wasatch had used threaded rod in place of the correct flexible stay bolts, along with other errors in welding and machining. The matter went to court, where it was decided in late 2020 that Wasatch owed $730,284.60 in damages to the Big South Fork Scenic due to the botched locomotive work.

The Como Roundhouse project operated by the South Park Rail Society also suffered similar mechanical faults on a locomotive Wasatch had worked on for them, former Klondike Mines Railway Klondike Kate. Klondike Kate was returned from Wasatch in 2017 and briefly operated at the Como site before mechanical problems sidelined the engine. Rather than perusing legal options against Wasatch, the society chose instead to crowd fund the needed money to repair the engine for service.

Shoshoni railcar explosion

On April 21, 2021; a tank car at Wasatch's Shoshoni shop exploded killing two employees, Dallas Mitchell (28) and Daniel Conway (19). Investigations into the accident suggested metal grinding inside the car which had been used to carry hazardous material had sparked while the men were working inside the tank, igniting and causing the explosion. First responders reported high amounts of dangerous fumes lingering on site at the time of their arrival. Conway was a recent high school graduate, and Mitchell was a father of five children; and a fund was set up in their memory after the accident.

Bankruptcy, Dissolution and Criminal Case

On September 14, 2021; Wasatch filed for Chapter 11 bankruptcy. While the bankruptcy was ongoing, Wasatch continued to attempt to operate with Rimmasch advocating to the Cheyenne City Council an idea for an expanded visitor's center at the Union Pacific railyards in the city. With no ability to financially recover due to a lack of new contracts, Wasatch dissolved on February 8, 2022.

The US Government investigated Wasatch over a failure to complete a contract for the National Park Service restoring a former Central Railroad of New Jersey coach for Steamtown. Wasatch had contracted the job in 2016, but the federal government accused Wasatch of billing them for work not completed, leading to trial. The investigation into Wasatch's conduct also discovered improper asbestos handling and other violations of their contract with the National Park Services. In addition the investigation accused Wasatch of violating the Davis-Bacon Act of 1931 via underpaying the employees associated with the project, with Rimmasch accused of sending false payrolls to the US Government as a cover-up of the wage discrepancy. The total charges included 5 counts of wire fraud and one count of endangerment. Rimmasch and Wasatch were found guilty on all counts on April 14, 2022. Sentencing was set for July of that year. The sentence was given on July 5, 2022; requiring Rimmasch to serve 30 months in prison and three years of probation upon release, along with fines and community service.

References 

Companies established in 1999
Companies disestablished in 2022
Rail transport
Railway accidents and incidents
Locomotive manufacturers